Michael J. Kurtz (born 20 Oct 1947) is an astrophysicist at Harvard University, He has held the title of Astronomer at the Center for Astrophysics  Harvard & Smithsonian since 1983, and the additional post of Computer Scientist at the Smithsonian Astrophysical Observatory since 1984. He is especially known both for his research into the distribution of galaxies, and for his creation of the Astrophysics Data System.

Biography
Kurtz received a BA in Physics from San Francisco State University in 1977 and a Ph.D. from Dartmouth College in 1982. From 1984 to 1992 he was Director of the Image Processing Laboratory.

Publications
His h-index is 38.

Astronomy
His most cited papers in astronomy are:
  (cited 340 times according to Google Scholar)
  (cited 288 times in Google Scholar)
  (cited 167 times in Google Scholar)
  (cited 174 times in Google Scholar)
  (cited 114 times in Google Scholar)

Bibliometrics/Scientometrics

His most cited publications in bibliometrics/scientometrics are
 "The Effect of Use and Access on Citations", by Kurtz, Michael J., Eichhorn, Guenther, Accomazzi, Alberto, Grant, Carolyn, Demleitner, Markus, Henneken, Edwin, and Murray, Stephen S.;  Information Processing and Management, 41, 1395 (2005) cited 185 times in Google Scholar
 "The NASA Astrophysics Data System: Overview", by Kurtz, Michael J., Eichhorn, Guenther, Accomazzi, Alberto, Grant, Carolyn S., Murray, Stephen S., and Watson, Joyce M.;  Astronomy and Astrophysics Supplement Series, 143, 41 (2000) cited 104 times in Google Scholar
 "The Bibliometric Properties of Article Readership Information", by Kurtz, Michael J., Eichhorn, Guenther, Accomazzi, Alberto, Grant, Carolyn S., Demleitner, Markus, Murray, Stephen S., Martimbeau, Nathalie, and Elwell, Barbara;  Journal of the American Society for Information Science and Technology, 56, 111 (2005) cited 100 times in Google Scholar
 "Worldwide Use and Impact of the NASA Astrophysics Data System Digital Library", by Kurtz, Michael J., Eichhorn, Guenther, Accomazzi, Alberto, Grant, Carolyn S., Demleitner, Markus, and Murray, Stephen S.;  Journal of the American Society for Information Science and Technology, 56, 36 (2005) cited 95 times in Google Scholar
 "Usage Bibliometrics", by Kurtz, Michael J. and Bollen, Johan;  Annual Review of Information Science and Technology, 44, 3 (2010) cited 58 times in Google Scholar
 "Intelligent Text Retrieval in the NASA Astrophysics Data System", by Kurtz, M. J., Karakashian, T., Grant, C. S., Eichhorn, G., Murray, S. S., Watson, J. M., Ossorio, P. G., and Stoner, J. L.;  Astronomical Data Analysis Software and Systems II, 52, 132 (1993) cited 32 times in Google Scholar

Awards
Elected a Legacy Fellow of the American Astronomical Society in 2020.
Van Biesbroeck Prize, American Astronomical Society, 2001, for design of the ADS Abstract Service 
ISI/ASIST Citation Award, American Society for Information Science and Technology, 2000,

References

External links
web page
Official Curriculum Vitae

1949 births
Living people
American astronomers
Fellows of the American Astronomical Society
Fellows of the American Physical Society